BDE may refer to:
	
BitLocker Drive Encryption, a full disk encryption feature included with Microsoft Windows
Bond-dissociation energy, the dissociation energy of a chemical bond
Borland Database Engine, a database engine by Borland
Bde, abbreviation for the military unit brigade
BDE, the station code for Bairnsdale railway station, Victoria, Australia
Brominated diaryl (or diphenyl) ethers, see Polybrominated diphenyl ethers

See also
BDEs (disambiguation)